Pinnocaris is a genus of rostroconch mollusc known from the Cambro-Ordovician.  It was once considered as a possible ancestor to the scaphopods, but this no longer seems tenable.  Original descriptions from material in southern Scotland had the organism as a bivalved arthropod, but its univalved disposition has since become clear.

References

Prehistoric mollusc genera